Cowboy Songs III – Rhymes of the Renegades is the eighteenth album by American singer-songwriter Michael Martin Murphey and his third album of cowboy songs. The album is devoted to cowboy folklore and true tales of the West and focuses on real-life outlaws, from Jesse James to Billy The Kid to Belle Starr. Murphey performs these songs "with a scholar's eye and a fan's heart."

Track listing
 "Big Iron" (with Marty Robbins) (Robbins) – 4:09
 "Rhymes of the Renegades" (Murphey) – 4:35
 "Riders in the Sky" (Jones) – 3:28
 "El Paso" (Robbins) – 4:52
 "Sonora's Death Row" (Farrell) – 4:30
 "Ballad of Billy the Kid" – 4:03
 "Billy Gray" (with Debbie Nims) (Blake) – 4:10
 "Roses and Thorns" (with Ryan Murphey) (Murphey) – 4:18
 "Strawberry Roan" (with Chris LeDoux) (Fletcher) – 3:44
 "The Wild West Is Gonna Get Wilder" (Murphey) – 4:28
 "The Ballad of Jesse James" – 4:18
 "Frank James' Farewell" (with Hal Ketchum) (Burr, Ketchum) – 3:41
 "Cole Younger" (with Hal Ketchum) (Traditional) – 3:57
 "Belle Star" (with Bill Miller) (Murphey) – 6:02
 "Queen of Heartaches" (Murphey, Rains) – 4:23
 "Sam Bass" (Traditional) – 4:51
 "Birmingham Jail" – 4:52

Credits
Music
 Michael Martin Murphey – vocals, producer, liner notes
 Marty Robbins – vocals
 Debbie Nims – vocals
 Hal Ketchum – vocals
 Chris LeDoux – vocals
 Bill Miller – vocals
 Sam D. Bass – author
 Pat Flynn – acoustic guitar
 Chris Leuzinger – 6-string bass, 12-string guitar, acoustic guitar, electric guitar, bass
 Mark Casstevens – acoustic guitar, harmonica, jaw harp
 John McEuen – banjo
 David Coe – mandolin
 Sonny Garrish – dobro, steel guitar
 Alisa Jones Wall – hammer dulcimer
 Joey Miskulin – accordion, piano, producer
 Dennis Burnside – piano, synthesizer
 David Hoffner – synthesizer
 Rob Hajacos – fiddle
 Sam Bush – fiddle, mandolin
 Stuart Duncan – fiddle, mandolin
 George Tidwell – trumpet
 Ryan Murphey – background vocals
 Dennis Wilson – background vocals
 Roy M. "Junior" Husky – acoustic and electric bass
 Craig Nelson – acoustic and electric bass
 Roy Huskey, Jr. – acoustic and electric bass
 Lonnie Wilson – drums, percussion
 Tommy Wells – drums, percussion
 Sam Bacco – Percussion

Production
 Toby Seay – engineer
 Gary Paczosa – engineer
 Ed Simonton – engineer, assistant engineer
 John Kunz – assistant, assistant engineer
 Marshall Morgan – mixing
 Denny Purcell – mastering
 Patricia Miskulin – production coordination
 Laura LiPuma – art direction
 William Matthews – cover design
 Prof. Thomas Dimsdale – liner notes
 Garrett Rittenberry – design
 David Michael Kennedy – photography
 Willie Matthews – paintings

References

External links
 Michael Martin Murphey's official website

1993 albums
Michael Martin Murphey albums
Warner Records albums
Sequel albums